In music, Op. 129 stands for Opus number 129. Compositions that are assigned this number include:

 Beethoven – Rage Over a Lost Penny
 Schumann – Cello Concerto
 Shostakovich – Violin Concerto No. 2
 Tveitt – Piano Sonata No. 29